This is a list of notable events in country music that took place in the year 1984.

Events
 June 22 — The movie Rhinestone, starring Dolly Parton and Sylvester Stallone, is released to universally negative reviews. The much-hyped movie – about a singer's effort to transform a New York City taxicab driver into a country star within two weeks – flops, but still produces several hit singles, most notably the No. 1 hit "Tennessee Homesick Blues".
 July 28 — With his No. 1 hit "Angel in Disguise", Earl Thomas Conley becomes the first artist in any genre to have four Billboard chart-topping songs from the same album. The album in question is Don't Make it Easy For Me, and in addition to "Angel in Disguise" and the title track, Conley also hit with 1983's "Your Love's on the Line" and "Holding Her and Loving You". The feat is part of Conley's impressive 1980s streak, where he enjoyed 16 No. 1 hits through 1989.
 September 11 — Barbara Mandrell is seriously injured in a car accident. She suffers multiple injuries and takes an 18-month sabbatical from performing to recover.

Top hits of the year

Singles released by American artists

Singles released by Canadian artists

Top new album releases

Other top albums
{| class="wikitable sortable"
|-
! US
! Album
! Artist
! Record Label
|-
| style="text-align:center;"| 47
| Building Bridges
| Larry Willoughby
| Atlantic America
|-
| style="text-align:center;"| 33
| By Request
| George Jones
| Epic
|-
| style="text-align:center;"| 55
| Can't Slow Down
| Lionel Richie
| Motown
|-
| style="text-align:center;"| 42
| Can't Wait All Night
| Juice Newton
| RCA
|-
| style="text-align:center;"| 29
| Charly
| Charly McClain
| Epic
|-
| style="text-align:center;"| 31
| Christmas at Our House
| Barbara Mandrell
| MCA
|-
| style="text-align:center;"| 56
| Day by Day
| McGuffey Lane
| Atlantic America
|-
| style="text-align:center;"| 55
| Do I Ever Cross Your Mind
| Ray Charles
| Columbia
|-
| style="text-align:center;"| 43
| Duets
| Kenny Rogers, Sheena EastonDottie West & Kim Carnes
| Liberty
|-
| style="text-align:center;"| 55
| Easy Street
| The Wright Brothers
| Mercury/PolyGram
|-
| style="text-align:center;"| 63
| Fallen Angel
| Gus Hardin
| RCA
|-
| style="text-align:center;"| 45
| First Time Live
| George Jones
| Epic
|-
| style="text-align:center;"| 35
| Foolin' with Fire
| Johnny Rodriguez
| Epic
|-
| style="text-align:center;"| 46
| For the Record: The First 10 Years
| David Allan Coe
| Columbia
|-
| style="text-align:center;"| 55
| A Golden Celebration
| Elvis Presley
| RCA
|-
| style="text-align:center;"| 45
| Golden Duets–The Best of Frizzell & West
| David Frizzell & Shelly West
| Viva
|-
| style="text-align:center;"| 28
| Greatest Hits
| John Anderson
| Warner Bros.
|-
| style="text-align:center;"| 64
| Greatest Hits
| Juice Newton
| Capitol
|-
| style="text-align:center;"| 40
| Hearts on Fire
| Karen Brooks
| Warner Bros.
|-
| style="text-align:center;"| 57
| ''Highrollin| The Maines Brothers Band
| Mercury/PolyGram
|-
| style="text-align:center;"| 41
| His Epic Hits: The First 11 (To Be Continued...)
| Merle Haggard
| Epic
|-
| style="text-align:center;"| 41
| Homecoming| Ed Bruce
| RCA
|-
| style="text-align:center;"| 41
| I Could Use Another You| Eddy Raven
| RCA
|-
| style="text-align:center;"| 58
| I Still Do| Bill Medley
| RCA
|-
| style="text-align:center;"| 54
| I'm Not Through Loving You Yet| Louise Mandrell
| RCA
|-
| style="text-align:center;"| 33
| In Session| David Frizzell & Shelly West
| Viva
|-
| style="text-align:center;"| 41
| Julio| Julio Iglesias
| Columbia
|-
| style="text-align:center;"| 63
| Karen| Karen Taylor-Good
| Mesa
|-
| style="text-align:center;"| 42
| Kathy Mattea| Kathy Mattea
| Mercury/PolyGram
|-
| style="text-align:center;"| 52
| Let Me Be the First| Deborah Allen
| RCA
|-
| style="text-align:center;"| 30
| Letter to Home| Glen Campbell
| Atlantic America
|-
| style="text-align:center;"| 34
| Little by Little| Gene Watson
| MCA
|-
| style="text-align:center;"| 40
| Love Is on the Radio| Tom Jones
| Mercury/PolyGram
|-
| style="text-align:center;"| 26
| Magic| Mark Gray
| Columbia
|-
| style="text-align:center;"| 64
| Mel McDaniel with Oklahoma Wind| Mel McDaniel
| Capitol
|-
| style="text-align:center;"| 36
| The Midnight Hour| Razzy Bailey
| RCA
|-
| style="text-align:center;"| 45
| Motel Matches| Moe Bandy
| Columbia
|-
| style="text-align:center;"| 42
| Natural Dreams| Tom T. Hall
| Mercury/PolyGram
|-
| style="text-align:center;"| 62
| New Beginnings| David Wills
| RCA
|-
| style="text-align:center;"| 34
| New Patches| Mel Tillis
| MCA
|-
| style="text-align:center;"| 26
| One Owner Heart| T. G. Sheppard
| Warner Bros.
|-
| style="text-align:center;"| 57
| One Way Rider| The Osmond Brothers
| Warner Bros./Curb
|-
| style="text-align:center;"| 49
| Power of Love| Charley Pride
| RCA
|-
| style="text-align:center;"| 32
| Rhinestone (Soundtrack)| Dolly Parton and various artists
| RCA
|-
| style="text-align:center;"| 40
| Shining| B. J. Thomas
| Columbia
|-
| style="text-align:center;"| 65
| Soft Talk| Mac Davis
| Casablanca
|-
| style="text-align:center;"| 40
| Surprise| Sylvia
| RCA
|-
| style="text-align:center;"| 56
| Ten Years of Hits| Mickey Gilley
| Epic
|-
| style="text-align:center;"| 33
| This Ol' Piano| Mark Gray
| Columbia
|-
| style="text-align:center;"| 34
| Too Good to Stop Now| Mickey Gilley
| Epic
|-
| style="text-align:center;"| 64
| Turn Me Loose| Vince Gill
| RCA
|-
| style="text-align:center;"| 27
| Waylon's Greatest Hits, Vol. 2| Waylon Jennings
| RCA
|-
| style="text-align:center;"| 57
| Where Is a Woman to Go| Gail Davies
| RCA
|-
| style="text-align:center;"| 33
| Willing| Ronnie McDowell
| Epic
|-
| style="text-align:center;"| 47
| Writers in Disguise| Pinkard & Bowden
| Warner Bros.
|-
| style="text-align:center;"| 61
| You and I – Classic Country Duets| Various Artists
| Warner Bros.
|}

On television

Regular series
 Hee Haw (1969–1993, syndicated)
 That Nashville Music (1970–1985, syndicated)

Specials

Births
 February 5 – Tyler Farr, singer-songwriter since the mid-2010s, with hits including "Whiskey in My Water" and "Redneck Crazy".
 March 30 – Justin Moore, singer-songwriter from the late 2000s onward, who had hits including "Small Town USA" and "If Heaven Wasn't So Far Away".
 April 19 – Matt Stell, singer-songwriter better known for his 2019 single "Prayed for You".
 August 3 – Whitney Duncan, country music singer and reality TV contestant.
 November 26 – Mike Gossin, member of Gloriana.
 December 8 – Sam Hunt, singer-songwriter of the 2010s ("Leave the Night On").

Deaths
 January 28 — Al Dexter, 81, early honky tonk stylist best known for "Pistol Packin' Mama."
 May 11 — Nudie Cohen, 81, famous costume designer for country stars.
 July 30 - Jack Benny Lynn, 34, Son of Loretta Lynn and Oliver Lynn passes away after trying to ford the duck river at his parents Ranch in Hurricane Mills, TN. Lynn was 34 years of age and left behind a wife and 2 children. His mother, Loretta Lynn would not perform for another year after his death.
 September 6 — Ernest Tubb, 70, the "Texas Trubador" and a superstar since the 1940s (emphysema).
 December 26 — Sheila Andrews, 31, late 70s singer with several minor hits.

Hall of Fame inductees

Country Music Hall of Fame inductees
Ralph S. Peer (1892–1960)
Floyd Tillman (1914–2003)

Canadian Country Music Hall of Fame inductees
Wilf Carter
Tommy Hunter
Orval Prophet
William Harold Moon

Major awards

Grammy Awards
Best Female Country Vocal Performance — "In My Dreams", Emmylou Harris
Best Male Country Vocal Performance — "That's the Way Love Goes", Merle Haggard
Best Country Performance by a Duo or Group with Vocal — "Mama He's Crazy", The Judds
Best Country Instrumental Performance — "Wheel Hoss", Ricky Skaggs
Best Country Song — "City of New Orleans", Steve Goodman (Performer: Willie Nelson)

Juno Awards
Country Male Vocalist of the Year — Murray McLauchlan
Country Female Vocalist of the Year — Anne Murray
Country Group or Duo of the Year — The Good Brothers

Academy of Country Music
Entertainer of the Year — Alabama
Song of the Year — "Why Not Me", Harlan Howard, Brent Maher and Sonny Throckmorton (Performer: The Judds)
Single of the Year — "To All the Girls I've Loved Before", Willie Nelson and Julio Iglesias
Album of the Year — Roll On, Alabama
Top Male Vocalist — George Strait
Top Female Vocalist — Reba McEntire
Top Vocal Duo — The Judds
Top Vocal Group — Alabama
Top New Male Vocalist — Vince Gill
Top New Female Vocalist — Nicolette Larson
Video of the Year — "All My Rowdy Friends Are Coming Over Tonight", Hank Williams, Jr. (Directors: John Goodhue)

Canadian Country Music Association
Entertainer of the Year — Ronnie Prophet
Male Artist of the Year — Terry Carisse
Female Artist of the Year — Marie Bottrell
Group of the Year — Family Brown
SOCAN Song of the Year — "Jesus It's Me Again", Dick Damron (Performer: Dick Damron)
Single of the Year — "A Little Good News", Anne Murray
Album of the Year — Repeat After Me, Family Brown
Top Selling Album — Eyes That See in the Dark, Kenny Rogers
Vista Rising Star Award — Roni Summers
Duo of the Year — Glory Anne Carriere and Ronnie Prophet

Country Music Association
Entertainer of the Year — Alabama
Song of the Year — "Wind Beneath My Wings", Larry Henley and Jeff Silbar (Performer: Gary Morris)
Single of the Year — "A Little Good News", Anne Murray
Album of the Year — A Little Good News'', Anne MurrayMale Vocalist of the Year — Lee GreenwoodFemale Vocalist of the Year — Reba McEntireVocal Duo of the Year — Julio Iglesias and Willie NelsonVocal Group of the Year — The Statler BrothersHorizon Award — The JuddsInstrumentalist of the Year — Chet AtkinsInstrumental Group of the Year''' — Ricky Skaggs Band

Further reading
Kingsbury, Paul, "The Grand Ole Opry: History of Country Music. 70 Years of the Songs, the Stars and the Stories," Villard Books, Random House; Opryland USA, 1995
Kingsbury, Paul, "Vinyl Hayride: Country Music Album Covers 1947–1989," Country Music Foundation, 2003
Millard, Bob, "Country Music: 70 Years of America's Favorite Music," HarperCollins, New York, 1993
Whitburn, Joel, "Top Country Songs 1944–2005 – 6th Edition." 2005.

Other links
Country Music Association
Inductees of the Country Music Hall of Fame

External links
Country Music Hall of Fame

Country
Country music by year